Art history is the study of aesthetic objects and visual expression in historical and stylistic context. Traditionally, the discipline of art history emphasized painting, drawing, sculpture, architecture, ceramics and decorative arts; yet today, art history examines broader aspects of visual culture, including the various visual and conceptual outcomes related to an ever-evolving definition of art. Art history encompasses the study of objects created by different cultures around the world and throughout history that convey meaning, importance or serve usefulness primarily through visual representations.

As a discipline, art history is distinguished from art criticism, which is concerned with establishing a relative artistic value upon individual works with respect to others of comparable style or sanctioning an entire style or movement; and art theory or "philosophy of art", which is concerned with the fundamental nature of art. One branch of this area of study is aesthetics, which includes investigating the enigma of the sublime and determining the essence of beauty. Technically, art history is not these things, because the art historian uses historical method to answer the questions: How did the artist come to create the work?, Who were the patrons?, Who were their teachers?, Who was the audience?, Who were their disciples?, What historical forces shaped the artist's oeuvre and how did he or she and the creation, in turn, affect the course of artistic, political and social events? It is, however, questionable whether many questions of this kind can be answered satisfactorily without also considering basic questions about the nature of art. The current disciplinary gap between art history and the philosophy of art (aesthetics) often hinders this inquiry.

Methodologies
Art history is an interdisciplinary practice that analyzes the various factors—cultural, political, religious, economic or artistic—which contribute to visual appearance of a work of art.

Art historians employ a number of methods in their research into the ontology and history of objects.

Art historians often examine work in the context of its time. At best, this is done in a manner which respects its creator's motivations and imperatives; with consideration of the desires and prejudices of its patrons and sponsors; with a comparative analysis of themes and approaches of the creator's colleagues and teachers; and with consideration of iconography and symbolism. In short, this approach examines the work of art in the context of the world within which it was created.

Art historians also often examine work through an analysis of form; that is, the creator's use of line, shape, color, texture and composition. This approach examines how the artist uses a two-dimensional picture plane or the three dimensions of sculptural or architectural space to create their art. The way these individual elements are employed results in representational or non-representational art. Is the artist imitating an object or can the image be found in nature? If so, it is representational. The closer the art hews to perfect imitation, the more the art is realistic. Is the artist not imitating, but instead relying on symbolism or in an important way striving to capture nature's essence, rather than copy it directly? If so the art is non-representational—also called abstract. Realism and abstraction exist on a continuum. Impressionism is an example of a representational style that was not directly imitative, but strove to create an "impression" of nature. If the work is not representational and is an expression of the artist's feelings, longings and aspirations or is a search for ideals of beauty and form, the work is non-representational or a work of expressionism.

An iconographical analysis is one which focuses on particular design elements of an object. Through a close reading of such elements, it is possible to trace their lineage, and with it draw conclusions regarding the origins and trajectory of these motifs. In turn, it is possible to make any number of observations regarding the social, cultural, economic and aesthetic values of those responsible for producing the object.

Many art historians use critical theory to frame their inquiries into objects. Theory is most often used when dealing with more recent objects, those from the late 19th century onward. Critical theory in art history is often borrowed from literary scholars and it involves the application of a non-artistic analytical framework to the study of art objects. Feminist, Marxist, critical race, queer and postcolonial theories are all well established in the discipline. As in literary studies, there is an interest among scholars in nature and the environment, but the direction that this will take in the discipline has yet to be determined.

Timeline of prominent methods

Pliny the Elder and ancient precedents
The earliest surviving writing on art that can be classified as art history are the passages in Pliny the Elder's Natural History (c. AD 77-79), concerning the development of Greek sculpture and painting. From them it is possible to trace the ideas of Xenokrates of Sicyon (c. 280 BC), a Greek sculptor who was perhaps the first art historian. Pliny's work, while mainly an encyclopaedia of the sciences, has thus been influential from the Renaissance onwards. (Passages about techniques used by the painter Apelles c. (332-329 BC), have been especially well-known.) Similar, though independent, developments occurred in the 6th century China, where a canon of worthy artists was established by writers in the scholar-official class. These writers, being necessarily proficient in calligraphy, were artists themselves. The artists are described in the Six Principles of Painting formulated by Xie He.

Vasari and artists' biographies

While personal reminiscences of art and artists have long been written and read (see Lorenzo Ghiberti Commentarii, for the best early example), it was Giorgio Vasari, the Tuscan painter, sculptor and author of the Lives of the Most Excellent Painters, Sculptors, and Architects, who wrote the first true history of art. He emphasized art's progression and development, which was a milestone in this field. His was a personal and a historical account, featuring biographies of individual Italian artists, many of whom were his contemporaries and personal acquaintances. The most renowned of these was Michelangelo, and Vasari's account is enlightening, though biased in places.

Vasari's ideas about art were enormously influential, and served as a model for many, including in the north of Europe Karel van Mander's Schilder-boeck and Joachim von Sandrart's Teutsche Akademie. Vasari's approach held sway until the 18th century, when criticism was leveled at his biographical account of history.

Winckelmann and art criticism
Scholars such as Johann Joachim Winckelmann (1717–1768) criticized Vasari's "cult" of artistic personality, and they argued that the real emphasis in the study of art should be the views of the learned beholder and not the unique viewpoint of the charismatic artist. Winckelmann's writings thus were the beginnings of art criticism. His two most notable works that introduced the concept of art criticism were Gedanken über die Nachahmung der griechischen Werke in der Malerei und Bildhauerkunst, published in 1755, shortly before he left for Rome (Fuseli published an English translation in 1765 under the title Reflections on the Painting and Sculpture of the Greeks), and Geschichte der Kunst des Altertums (History of Art in Antiquity), published in 1764 (this is the first occurrence of the phrase ‘history of art’ in the title of a book)". Winckelmann critiqued the artistic excesses of Baroque and Rococo forms, and was instrumental in reforming taste in favor of the more sober Neoclassicism. Jacob Burckhardt (1818–1897), one of the founders of art history, noted that Winckelmann was 'the first to distinguish between the periods of ancient art and to link the history of style with world history'. From Winckelmann until the mid-20th century, the field of art history was dominated by German-speaking academics. Winckelmann's work thus marked the entry of art history into the high-philosophical discourse of German culture.

Winckelmann was read avidly by Johann Wolfgang Goethe and Friedrich Schiller, both of whom began to write on the history of art, and his account of the Laocoön group occasioned a response by Lessing. The emergence of art as a major subject of philosophical speculation was solidified by the appearance of Immanuel Kant's Critique of Judgment in 1790, and was furthered by Hegel's Lectures on Aesthetics. Hegel's philosophy served as the direct inspiration for Karl Schnaase's work. Schnaase's Niederländische Briefe established the theoretical foundations for art history as an autonomous discipline, and his Geschichte der bildenden Künste, one of the first historical surveys of the history of art from antiquity to the Renaissance, facilitated the teaching of art history in German-speaking universities. Schnaase's survey was published contemporaneously with a similar work by Franz Theodor Kugler.

Wölfflin and stylistic analysis
See: Formal analysis.
Heinrich Wölfflin (1864–1945), who studied under Burckhardt in Basel, is the "father" of modern art history. Wölfflin taught at the universities of Berlin, Basel, Munich, and Zurich. A number of students went on to distinguished careers in art history, including Jakob Rosenberg and Frida Schottmuller. He introduced a scientific approach to the history of art, focusing on three concepts. Firstly, he attempted to study art using psychology, particularly by applying the work of Wilhelm Wundt. He argued, among other things, that art and architecture are good if they resemble the human body. For example, houses were good if their façades looked like faces. Secondly, he introduced the idea of studying art through comparison. By comparing individual paintings to each other, he was able to make distinctions of style. His book Renaissance and Baroque developed this idea, and was the first to show how these stylistic periods differed from one another. In contrast to Giorgio Vasari, Wölfflin was uninterested in the biographies of artists. In fact he proposed the creation of an "art history without names." Finally, he studied art based on ideas of nationhood. He was particularly interested in whether there was an inherently "Italian" and an inherently "German" style. This last interest was most fully articulated in his monograph on the German artist Albrecht Dürer.

Riegl, Wickhoff, and the Vienna School

Contemporaneous with Wölfflin's career, a major school of art-historical thought developed at the University of Vienna. The first generation of the Vienna School was dominated by Alois Riegl and Franz Wickhoff, both students of Moritz Thausing, and was characterized by a tendency to reassess neglected or disparaged periods in the history of art. Riegl and Wickhoff both wrote extensively on the art of late antiquity, which before them had been considered as a period of decline from the classical ideal. Riegl also contributed to the revaluation of the Baroque.

The next generation of professors at Vienna included Max Dvořák, Julius von Schlosser, Hans Tietze, Karl Maria Swoboda, and Josef Strzygowski. A number of the most important twentieth-century art historians, including Ernst Gombrich, received their degrees at Vienna at this time. The term "Second Vienna School" (or "New Vienna School") usually refers to the following generation of Viennese scholars, including Hans Sedlmayr, Otto Pächt, and Guido Kaschnitz von Weinberg. These scholars began in the 1930s to return to the work of the first generation, particularly to Riegl and his concept of Kunstwollen, and attempted to develop it into a full-blown art-historical methodology. Sedlmayr, in particular, rejected the minute study of iconography, patronage, and other approaches grounded in historical context, preferring instead to concentrate on the aesthetic qualities of a work of art. As a result, the Second Vienna School gained a reputation for unrestrained and irresponsible formalism, and was furthermore colored by Sedlmayr's overt racism and membership in the Nazi party. This latter tendency was, however, by no means shared by all members of the school; Pächt, for example, was himself Jewish, and was forced to leave Vienna in the 1930s.

Panofsky and iconography

Our 21st-century understanding of the symbolic content of art comes from a group of scholars who gathered in Hamburg in the 1920s. The most prominent among them were Erwin Panofsky, Aby Warburg, Fritz Saxl and Gertrud Bing. Together they developed much of the vocabulary that continues to be used in the 21st century by art historians. "Iconography"—with roots meaning "symbols from writing" refers to subject matter of art derived from written sources—especially scripture and mythology. "Iconology" is a broader term that referred to all symbolism, whether derived from a specific text or not. Today art historians sometimes use these terms interchangeably.

Panofsky, in his early work, also developed the theories of Riegl, but became eventually more preoccupied with iconography, and in particular with the transmission of themes related to classical antiquity in the Middle Ages and Renaissance. In this respect his interests coincided with those of Warburg, the son of a wealthy family who had assembled an impressive library in Hamburg devoted to the study of the classical tradition in later art and culture. Under Saxl's auspices, this library was developed into a research institute, affiliated with the University of Hamburg, where Panofsky taught.

Warburg died in 1929, and in the 1930s Saxl and Panofsky, both Jewish, were forced to leave Hamburg. Saxl settled in London, bringing Warburg's library with him and establishing the Warburg Institute. Panofsky settled in Princeton at the Institute for Advanced Study. In this respect they were part of an extraordinary influx of German art historians into the English-speaking academy in the 1930s. These scholars were largely responsible for establishing art history as a legitimate field of study in the English-speaking world, and the influence of Panofsky's methodology, in particular, determined the course of American art history for a generation.

Freud and psychoanalysis
Heinrich Wölfflin was not the only scholar to invoke psychological theories in the study of art. Psychoanalyst Sigmund Freud wrote a book on the artist Leonardo da Vinci, in which he used Leonardo's paintings to interrogate the artist's psyche and sexual orientation. Freud inferred from his analysis that Leonardo was probably homosexual.

Though the use of posthumous material to perform psychoanalysis is controversial among art historians, especially since the sexual mores of Leonardo's time and Freud's are different, it is often attempted. One of the best-known psychoanalytic scholars is Laurie Schneider Adams, who wrote a popular textbook, Art Across Time, and a book Art and Psychoanalysis.

An unsuspecting turn for the history of art criticism came in 1914 when Sigmund Freud published a psychoanalytical interpretation of Michelangelo's Moses titled Der Moses des Michelangelo as one of the first psychology based analyses on a work of art. Freud first published this work shortly after reading Vasari's Lives. For unknown purposes, Freud originally published the article anonymously.

Jung and archetypes
Carl Jung also applied psychoanalytic theory to art. C.G. Jung was a Swiss psychiatrist, an influential thinker, and founder of analytical psychology. Jung's approach to psychology emphasized understanding the psyche through exploring the worlds of dreams, art, mythology, world religion and philosophy. Much of his life's work was spent exploring Eastern and Western philosophy, alchemy, astrology, sociology, as well as literature and the arts. His most notable contributions include his concept of the psychological archetype, the collective unconscious, and his theory of synchronicity. Jung believed that many experiences perceived as coincidence were not merely due to chance but, instead, suggested the manifestation of parallel events or circumstances reflecting this governing dynamic. He argued that a collective unconscious and archetypal imagery were detectable in art. His ideas were particularly popular among American Abstract expressionists in the 1940s and 1950s. His work inspired the surrealist concept of drawing imagery from dreams and the unconscious.

Jung emphasized the importance of balance and harmony. He cautioned that modern humans rely too heavily on science and logic and would benefit from integrating spirituality and appreciation of the unconscious realm. His work not only triggered analytical work by art historians, but it became an integral part of art-making. Jackson Pollock, for example, famously created a series of drawings to accompany his psychoanalytic sessions with his Jungian psychoanalyst, Dr. Joseph Henderson. Henderson who later published the drawings in a text devoted to Pollock's sessions realized how powerful the drawings were as a therapeutic tool.

The legacy of psychoanalysis in art history has been profound, and extends beyond Freud and Jung. The prominent feminist art historian Griselda Pollock, for example, draws upon psychoanalysis both in her reading into contemporary art and in her rereading of modernist art. With Griselda Pollock's reading of French feminist psychoanalysis and in particular the writings of Julia Kristeva and Bracha L. Ettinger, as with Rosalind Krauss readings of Jacques Lacan and Jean-François Lyotard and Catherine de Zegher's curatorial rereading of art, Feminist theory written in the fields of French feminism and Psychoanalysis has strongly informed the reframing of both men and women artists in art history.

Marx and ideology
During the mid-20th century, art historians embraced social history by using critical approaches. The goal was to show how art interacts with power structures in society. One critical approach that art historians used was Marxism. Marxist art history attempted to show how art was tied to specific classes, how images contain information about the economy, and how images can make the status quo seem natural (ideology).

Marcel Duchamp and Dada Movement jump started the Anti-art style. Various artist did not want to create artwork that everyone was conforming to at the time. These two movements helped other artist to create pieces that were not viewed as traditional art. Some examples of styles that branched off the anti-art movement would be Neo-Dadaism, Surrealism, and Constructivism. These styles and artist did not want to surrender to traditional ways of art. This way of thinking provoked political movements such as the Russian Revolution and the communist ideals.

Artist Isaak Brodsky work of art 'Shock-worker from Dneprstroi' in 1932 shows his political involvement within art. This piece of art can be analysed to show the internal troubles Soviet Russia was experiencing at the time.
Perhaps the best-known Marxist was Clement Greenberg, who came to prominence during the late 1930s with his essay "Avant-Garde and Kitsch". In the essay Greenberg claimed that the avant-garde arose in order to defend aesthetic standards from the decline of taste involved in consumer society, and seeing kitsch and art as opposites. Greenberg further claimed that avant-garde and Modernist art was a means to resist the leveling of culture produced by capitalist propaganda. Greenberg appropriated the German word 'kitsch' to describe this consumerism, although its connotations have since changed to a more affirmative notion of leftover materials of capitalist culture. Greenberg later became well known for examining the formal properties of modern art.

Meyer Schapiro is one of the best-remembered Marxist art historians of the mid-20th century. Although he wrote about numerous time periods and themes in art, he is best remembered for his commentary on sculpture from the late Middle Ages and early Renaissance, at which time he saw evidence of capitalism emerging and feudalism declining.

Arnold Hauser wrote the first Marxist survey of Western Art, entitled The Social History of Art. He attempted to show how class consciousness was reflected in major art periods. The book was controversial when published during the 1950s since it makes generalizations about entire eras, a strategy now called "vulgar Marxism".

Marxist Art History was refined in the department of Art History at UCLA with scholars such as T.J. Clark, O.K. Werckmeister, David Kunzle, Theodor W. Adorno, and Max Horkheimer. T.J. Clark was the first art historian writing from a Marxist perspective to abandon vulgar Marxism. He wrote Marxist art histories of several impressionist and realist artists, including Gustave Courbet and Édouard Manet. These books focused closely on the political and economic climates in which the art was created.

Feminist art history
Linda Nochlin's essay "Why Have There Been No Great Women Artists?" helped to ignite feminist art history during the 1970s and remains one of the most widely read essays about female artists. This was then followed by a 1972 College Art Association Panel, chaired by Nochlin, entitled "Eroticism and the Image of Woman in Nineteenth-Century Art". Within a decade, scores of papers, articles, and essays sustained a growing momentum, fueled by the Second-wave feminist movement, of critical discourse surrounding women's interactions with the arts as both artists and subjects.  In her pioneering essay, Nochlin applies a feminist critical framework to show systematic exclusion of women from art training, arguing that exclusion from practicing art as well as the canonical history of art was the consequence of cultural conditions which curtailed and restricted women from art producing fields. The few who did succeed were treated as anomalies and did not provide a model for subsequent success. Griselda Pollock is another prominent feminist art historian, whose use of psychoanalytic theory is described above.

While feminist art history can focus on any time period and location, much attention has been given to the Modern era. Some of this scholarship centers on the feminist art movement, which referred specifically to the experience of women. Often, feminist art history offers a critical "re-reading" of the Western art canon, such as Carol Duncan's re-interpretation of Les Demoiselles d'Avignon.  Two pioneers of the field are Mary Garrard and Norma Broude. Their anthologies Feminism and Art History: Questioning the Litany, The Expanding Discourse: Feminism and Art History, and Reclaiming Feminist Agency: Feminist Art History After Postmodernism are substantial efforts to bring feminist perspectives into the discourse of art history.  The pair also co-founded the Feminist Art History Conference.

Barthes and semiotics
As opposed to iconography which seeks to identify meaning, semiotics is concerned with how meaning is created. Roland Barthes's connoted and denoted meanings are paramount to this examination. In any particular work of art, an interpretation depends on the identification of denoted meaning—the recognition of a visual sign, and the connoted meaning—the instant cultural associations that come with recognition. The main concern of the semiotic art historian is to come up with ways to navigate and interpret connoted meaning.

Semiotic art history seeks to uncover the codified meaning or meanings in an aesthetic object by examining its connectedness to a collective consciousness. Art historians do not commonly commit to any one particular brand of semiotics but rather construct an amalgamated version which they incorporate into their collection of analytical tools. For example, Meyer Schapiro borrowed Saussure's differential meaning in effort to read signs as they exist within a system. According to Schapiro, to understand the meaning of frontality in a specific pictorial context, it must be differentiated from, or viewed in relation to, alternate possibilities such as a profile, or a three-quarter view. Schapiro combined this method with the work of Charles Sanders Peirce whose object, sign, and interpretant provided a structure for his approach. Alex Potts demonstrates the application of Peirce's concepts to visual representation by examining them in relation to the Mona Lisa. By seeing the Mona Lisa, for example, as something beyond its materiality is to identify it as a sign. It is then recognized as referring to an object outside of itself, a woman, or Mona Lisa. The image does not seem to denote religious meaning and can therefore be assumed to be a portrait. This interpretation leads to a chain of possible interpretations: who was the sitter in relation to Leonardo da Vinci? What significance did she have to him? Or, maybe she is an icon for all of womankind. This chain of interpretation, or “unlimited semiosis” is endless; the art historian's job is to place boundaries on possible interpretations as much as it is to reveal new possibilities.

Semiotics operates under the theory that an image can only be understood from the viewer's perspective. The artist is supplanted by the viewer as the purveyor of meaning, even to the extent that an interpretation is still valid regardless of whether the creator had intended it. Rosalind Krauss espoused this concept in her essay “In the Name of Picasso.” She denounced the artist's monopoly on meaning and insisted that meaning can only be derived after the work has been removed from its historical and social context. Mieke Bal argued similarly that meaning does not even exist until the image is observed by the viewer. It is only after acknowledging this that meaning can become opened up to other possibilities such as feminism or psychoanalysis.

Museum studies and collecting
Aspects of the subject which have come to the fore in recent decades include interest in the patronage and consumption of art, including the economics of the art market, the role of collectors, the intentions and aspirations of those commissioning works, and the reactions of contemporary and later viewers and owners. Museum studies, including the history of museum collecting and display, is now a specialized field of study, as is the history of collecting.

New materialism
Scientific advances have made possible much more accurate investigation of the materials and techniques used to create works, especially infra-red and x-ray photographic techniques which have allowed many underdrawings of paintings to be seen again. Proper analysis of pigments used in paint is now possible, which has upset many attributions. Dendrochronology for panel paintings and radio-carbon dating for old objects in organic materials have allowed scientific methods of dating objects to confirm or upset dates derived from stylistic analysis or documentary evidence. The development of good colour photography, now held digitally and available on the internet or by other means, has transformed the study of many types of art, especially those covering objects existing in large numbers which are widely dispersed among collections, such as illuminated manuscripts and Persian miniatures, and many types of archaeological artworks.

Concurrent to those technological advances, art historians have shown increasing interest in new theoretical approaches to the nature of artworks as objects. Thing theory, actor–network theory, and object-oriented ontology have played an increasing role in art historical literature.

Nationalist art history
The making of art, the academic history of art, and the history of art museums are closely intertwined with the rise of nationalism. Art created in the modern era, in fact, has often been an attempt to generate feelings of national superiority or love of one's country. Russian art is an especially good example of this, as the Russian avant-garde and later Soviet art were attempts to define that country's identity.

Most art historians working today identify their specialty as the art of a particular culture and time period, and often such cultures are also nations. For example, someone might specialize in the 19th-century German or contemporary Chinese art history. A focus on nationhood has deep roots in the discipline. Indeed, Vasari's Lives of the Most Excellent Painters, Sculptors, and Architects is an attempt to show the superiority of Florentine artistic culture, and Heinrich Wölfflin's writings (especially his monograph on Albrecht Dürer) attempt to distinguish Italian from German styles of art.

Many of the largest and most well-funded art museums of the world, such as the Louvre, the Victoria and Albert Museum, and the National Gallery of Art in Washington are state-owned. Most countries, indeed, have a national gallery, with an explicit mission of preserving the cultural patrimony owned by the government—regardless of what cultures created the art—and an often implicit mission to bolster that country's own cultural heritage. The National Gallery of Art thus showcases art made in the United States, but also owns objects from across the world.

Divisions by period
The discipline of art history is traditionally divided into specializations or concentrations based on eras and regions, with further sub-division based on media. Thus, someone might specialize in "19th-century German architecture" or in "16th-century Tuscan sculpture." Sub-fields are often included under a specialization. For example, the Ancient Near East, Greece, Rome, and Egypt are all typically considered special concentrations of Ancient art. In some cases, these specializations may be closely allied (as Greece and Rome, for example), while in others such alliances are far less natural (Indian art versus Korean art, for example).

Non-Western or global perspectives on art have become increasingly predominant in the art historical canon since the 1980s.

"Contemporary art history" refers to research into the period from the 1960s until today reflecting the break from the assumptions of modernism brought by artists of the neo-avant-garde and a continuity in contemporary art in terms of practice based on conceptualist and post-conceptualist practices.

Professional organizations
In the United States, the most important art history organization is the College Art Association. It organizes an annual conference and publishes the Art Bulletin and Art Journal. Similar organizations exist in other parts of the world, as well as for specializations, such as architectural history and Renaissance art history. In the UK, for example, the Association of Art Historians is the premiere organization, and it publishes a journal titled Art History.

See also 

Aesthetics
Art criticism
Bildwissenschaft
Fine Arts
History of art
Rock art studies
Visual arts and Theosophy
Women in the art history field

Notes and references

Further reading
Listed by date
Wölfflin, H. (1915, trans. 1932). Principles of art history; the problem of the development of style in later art. [New York]: Dover Publications.
Hauser, A. (1959). The philosophy of art history. New York: Knopf.
Arntzen, E., & Rainwater, R. (1980). Guide to the literature of art history. Chicago: American Library Association.
Holly, M. A. (1984). Panofsky and the foundations of art history. Ithaca, N.Y.: Cornell University Press.
Johnson, W. M. (1988). Art history: its use and abuse. Toronto: University of Toronto Press.
Carrier, D. (1991). Principles of art history writing. University Park, Pa: Pennsylvania State University Press.
Kemal, Salim, and Ivan Gaskell (1991). The Language of Art History. Cambridge University Press. 
Fitzpatrick, V. L. N. V. D. (1992). Art history: a contextual inquiry course. Point of view series. Reston, VA: National Art Education Association.
Minor, Vernon Hyde. (1994). Critical Theory of Art History. Englewood Cliffs, NJ: Prentice Hall.
Nelson, R. S., & Shiff, R. (1996). Critical terms for art history. Chicago: University of Chicago Press.
Adams, L. (1996). The methodologies of art: an introduction. New York, NY: IconEditions.
Frazier, N. (1999). The Penguin concise dictionary of art history. New York: Penguin Reference.
Pollock, G., (1999). Differencing the Canon. Routledge. 
Harrison, Charles, Paul Wood, and Jason Gaiger. (2000). Art in Theory 1648-1815: An Anthology of Changing Ideas. Malden, MA: Blackwell.
Minor, Vernon Hyde. (2001). Art history's history. 2nd ed. Upper Saddle River, NJ: Prentice Hall.
Robinson, Hilary. (2001). Feminism-Art-Theory: An Anthology, 1968–2000. Malden, MA: Blackwell.
Clark, T.J. (2001). Farewell to an Idea: Episodes from a History of Modernism. New Haven: Yale University Press.
Buchloh, Benjamin. (2001). Neo-Avantgarde and Culture Industry. Cambridge, MA: MIT Press.
Mansfield, Elizabeth (2002). Art History and Its Institutions: Foundations of a Discipline. Routledge. 
Murray, Chris. (2003). Key Writers on Art. 2 vols, Routledge Key Guides. London: Routledge.
Harrison, Charles, and Paul Wood. (2003). Art in Theory, 1900–2000: An Anthology of Changing Ideas. 2nd ed. Malden, MA: Blackwell.
Shiner, Larry. (2003). The Invention of Art: A Cultural History. Chicago: University of Chicago Press. 
Pollock, Griselda (ed.) (2006). Psychoanalysis and the Image. Oxford: Blackwell. 
Emison, Patricia (2008). The Shaping of Art History. University Park: The Pennsylvania State University Press. 
 Charlene Spretnak (2014), The Spiritual Dynamic in Modern Art : Art History Reconsidered, 1800 to the Present.
Gauvin Alexander Bailey (2014) The Spiritual Rococo: Décor and Divinity from the Salons of Paris to the Missions of Patagonia. Farnham: Ashgate.
John-Paul Stonard (2021) Creation. Art Since the Beginning. London and New York: Bloomsbury ISBN 978-1408879689

External links

Art History Resources on the Web in-depth directory of web links, divided by period (archived 6 March 2016)
Dictionary of Art Historians, a database of notable art historians maintained by Duke University
Rhode Island College LibGuide – Art and Art History Resources

 
Art criticism
Fields of history
Humanities